The 2012–13 Wagner Seahawks men's basketball team represented Wagner College during the 2012–13 NCAA Division I men's basketball season. The Seahawks were led by the youngest men's head coach in NCAA Division I, Bashir Mason, who was 28 when he was elevated from an assistant position in March 2012 following the departure of Dan Hurley for Rhode Island. The Seahawks played their home games at Spiro Sports Center and were members of the Northeast Conference. They finished the season 19–12, 12–6 in NEC play to finish in a three-way tie for second place. They advanced to the semifinals of the Northeast tournament where they lost to Long Island. For the second consecutive year, despite a winning record, Wagner choose not to participate in a post season tournament.

Roster

Schedule

|-
!colspan=9| Regular season

|-
!colspan=9| 2013 Northeast Conference men's basketball tournament

References 

Wagner Seahawks men's basketball seasons
Wagner